Donald Reignoux (born May 20, 1982) is a French actor best known for his dubbing and radio roles. He is known for dubbing Spider-Man in The Amazing Spider-Man, The Amazing Spider-Man 2 and the video game Spider-Man (2018). He is also known for dubbing Jesse Eisenberg in The Social Network and some DCEU films, like Batman v Superman: Dawn of Justice, Justice League, and Zack Snyder's Justice League.

Voice roles

Television animation
The Adventures of Jimmy Neutron, Boy Genius (Carl Wheezer)
The Amazing Spiez! (Lee)
American Dragon: Jake Long (Brad Morton)
As Told by Ginger (Blake Gripling)
Batman: The Brave and the Bold (Green Arrow)
Ben 10: Alien Force (Kevin Levin) 
Blaze and the Monster Machines (Blaze) 
Codename: Kids Next Door (Numbuh 4)
Danny Phantom (Danny Fenton)
Digimon (Tai Kamiya, Wormmon)
DuckTales (Louie)
The Fairly OddParents (Elmer)
Futurama (Cubert)
Legion of Super Heroes (Brainiac 5)
Lilo & Stitch: The Series (Keoni Jameson)
The Loud House (Clyde McBride)
The Magic School Bus (Carlos)
Martin Mystery (Marvin)
Mr. Baby (Rudy a.k.a. Ludo)
My Dad the Rock Star (Buzz Sawchuck)
Neon Genesis Evangelion (Shinji Ikari)
The Neverending Story (Bastian Balthazar Bux)
The Penguins of Madagascar (Mort)
PAW Patrol (Francois, Jake)
Phineas and Ferb (Phineas Flynn)
Recess (T.J. Detweiler)
Rocket Power (Otto Rocket)
Quack Pack (Louie)
Skyland (Mahad)
Totally Spies! (Arnold)
Young Justice (Robin)
Scissor Seven (Michelangelo Qiang)

Film

The Super Mario Bros. Movie (Kamek)
Anastasia (Young Dimitri)
Cars (D.J.)
Hoodwinked (Twitchy)
Horton Hears a Who! (Jojo)
How to Train Your Dragon (Hiccup)
James and the Giant Peach (James Henry Trotter)
Meet the Robinsons (Carl)
My Neighbor Totoro (Kanta Ōgaki)
Recess: School's Out (T.J. Detweiler)
Space Chimps (Ham)
Spirited Away (Haku)
The Land Before Time 2-5 (Littlefoot)
Toy Story (Andy Davis)
The Lorax (The Once-Ler)
Frozen (Kristoff)

Video games
Cars (D.J.)
Kingdom Hearts (Sora)
Kingdom Hearts II (Sora)
Psychonauts (Razputin)
Overwatch (Lúcio)
The Legend of Zelda: Breath of the Wild (Yunobo)
Detroit: Become Human (Connor)
Spider-Man (2018) (Spider-Man)
No Straight Roads (Zuke)
Tom Clancy's Ghost Recon Wildlands (Weaver)

Live action roles
Sleepy Hollow (Masbath)
Malcolm in the Middle (Reese)
Even Stevens (Louis Stevens)
The O.C. (Seth Cohen)
Agent Cody Banks and Agent Cody Banks 2: Destination London (Cody Banks)
High School Musical, High School Musical 2 and High School Musical 3 (Ryan Evans)
Wizards of Waverly Place (Justin Russo)
The Golden Compass (Pan)
Never Back Down (Jake Tyler)
Tropic Thunder (Kevin Sandusky)
The Social Network (Mark Zuckerberg)
The Amazing Spider-Man and The Amazing Spider-Man 2 (Spider-Man)
Interstellar (Adult Tom Cooper)
Batman v Superman: Dawn of Justice, Justice League and Zack Snyder's Justice League (Lex Luthor)
Élite (Nano)
The 100 (Jasper)
The Umbrella Academy (Klaus)

External links
Partial voiceography at Doublagissimo!
Donald Reignoux at Malcolm France
Donald Reignoux at Kingdom Fantasy
 

1982 births
Living people
People from Courbevoie
French male voice actors